is a private coeducational senior high school in Abeno-ku, Osaka, Japan.

It was formerly  but later became coeducational.

References

External links
 Abeno Shogaku High School 
 
 Osaka Girls' Senior High School Japan Student Exchange Program

Abeno-ku, Osaka
Schools in Osaka
High schools in Osaka Prefecture
Private schools in Japan